Böck may refer to:

 Helmut Böck (diplomat), Austrian diplomat
 Helmut Böck (skier) (born 1931), German Nordic skier
 Johann Michael Böck (1743–1793), German actor
 Ludwig Böck (1902–1960), German skier

See also
 Bock (disambiguation)